Valbonë is a village in the Kukës County, northern Albania. It is part of the former municipality Margegaj, and situated in the valley of the river Valbonë, south of the mountain Maja e Thatë. At the 2015 local government reform it became part of the municipality Tropojë. As one of the main settlements of Valbonë Valley National Park, it provides appropriate accommodation for visitors and tourists, mostly in typical alpine houses or inns.

Gallery

See also
 Geography of Albania
 Tourism in Albania
 Valbona Valley National Park

References

External links

Journey to Valbona website

Populated places in Tropojë
Villages in Kukës County